Zalesovsky (masculine), Zalesovskaya (feminine), or Zalesovskoye (neuter) may refer to:

Zalesovsky District, a district of Altai Krai, Russia
Zalesovsky (rural locality), a rural locality (a settlement) in Kurgan Oblast, Russia